Prunus pojarkovii is a species of bush cherry native to southern Turkmenistan and Golestan of Iran.

References 

pojarkovii